Senator Anderson may refer to:

Members of the Northern Irish Senate
Albert Anderson (politician) (1907–1986), Northern Irish Senator from 1963 to 1968

Members of the United States Senate
Alexander O. Anderson (1794–1869), U.S. Senator from Tennessee from 1840 to 1841, later served in the California State Senate
Clinton Anderson (1895–1975), U.S. Senator from New Mexico from 1949 to 1973
Joseph Anderson (1757–1837), U.S. Senator from Tennessee from 1797 to 1815
Wendell R. Anderson (1933–2016), U.S. Senator from Minnesota from 1976 to 1978, also in the Minnesota State Senate

United States state senate members
Bill Anderson (Iowa politician) (born 1977), Iowa State Senate
Bruce Anderson (politician) (born 1950), Minnesota State Senate
Cal Anderson (1948–1995), Washington State Senate
Casey O. Anderson (fl. 2010s), Utah State Senate
Charles Anderson (governor) (1814–1895), Ohio State Senate
D. G. Anderson (born 1930), Hawaii State Senate
Dick Anderson (born 1946), Florida State Senate
Doug Anderson (politician) (1939–2013), Mississippi State Senate
Ellen Anderson (born 1959), Minnesota State Senate
Floyd E. Anderson (1891–1976), New York State Senate
Gary Anderson (sport shooter) (born 1939), Nebraska State Senate
Glenn S. Anderson (born 1954), Michigan State Senate
Howard C. Anderson Jr., North Dakota State Senate
Howard P. Anderson (1915–2000), Virginia State Senate
James Lee Anderson (born 1948), Wyoming State Senate
Jerald C. Anderson (1934–2014), Minnesota State Senate
Jim Anderson (American politician) (born 1943), Wyoming State Senate
Joel Anderson (born 1960), California State Senate
John T. Anderson (1804–1879), Virginia State Senate
John Anderson (Wisconsin senator) (1870–1954), Wisconsin State Senate
John Anderson Jr. (1917–2014), Kansas State Senate
Josiah M. Anderson (1807–1861), Tennessee State Senate
Laurie Monnes Anderson (born 1945), Oregon State Senate
LeRoy H. Anderson (1906–1991), Montana State Senate
Mark Anderson (Arizona politician) (born 1957), Arizona State Senate
Matthew Anderson (politician) (1822–1910), Wisconsin State Senate
Neil Anderson (Illinois politician) (born 1982), Illinois State Senate
Patrick Anderson (Oklahoma politician) (born 1967), Oklahoma State Senate
Paul Anderson (Minnesota state senator) (born 1973), Minnesota State Senate
Quentin V. Anderson (1932–2019), Iowa State Senate
Ralph Anderson (politician) (1927–2019), South Carolina State Senate
Robert P. Anderson (1906–1978), Connecticut State Senate
Victor Emanuel Anderson (1902–1962), Nebraska State Senate
Warren M. Anderson (1915–2007), New York State Senate
Whitney Anderson (born 1931), Hawaii State Senate

See also
Elmer L. Andersen (1909–2004), Minnesota State Senate
James A. Andersen (1924–2022), Washington State Senate